APDS may refer to: 
 Activated PI3K Delta Syndrome
 Armour-piercing discarding sabot
 Augusta Preparatory Day School

See also 
 APD (disambiguation)